Ferguson Glacier is a glacier on the east side of Gallagher Ridge in the Asgard Range, McMurdo Dry Valleys, Antarctica. It flows north parallel to Decker Glacier, the two glaciers merging before reaching the snout of Wright Lower Glacier. In association with Tractor Corner nearby, it was named by the New Zealand Geographic Board in 1998 to recall the passage of Massey Ferguson tractors over the Wright Lower Glacier en route to Wright Valley in 1967.

References 

Glaciers of the Asgard Range
Glaciers of Scott Coast